Antioch was a town in Garvin County, Oklahoma, United States. It was located 10 miles west of Pauls Valley and had a post office from September 6, 1895, until May 14, 1932.

References

External links
 Antioch, Oklahoma
 Ghost Towns and Almost Ghost Towns of Oklahoma

Populated places in Garvin County, Oklahoma